is a Japanese Paralympic judoka in Lightweight.

In 2004 he won the silver medal in the men's 60 kg, but was not upgraded when Sergio Arturo Perez was stripped of his gold medal after testing positive for a banned substance.
In 2008 he made it to the quarter-finals but lost to Mouloud Noura (Algeria).
In 2012 he switched to 66 kg (half-lightweight) and lost the semi-final to Zhao Xu (China).
The 2016 Summer Paralympics in Rio will be his fourth Games. In the 60 kg, he won his second silver medal when Sherzod Namozov (Uzbekistan) beat him in the final.

At the 2010 Asian Para Games he won a bronze medal in the men's -66 kg event.

References

External links 
 

1976 births
Living people
Japanese male judoka
Paralympic judoka of Japan
Paralympic silver medalists for Japan
Paralympic medalists in judo
Judoka at the 2004 Summer Paralympics
Judoka at the 2008 Summer Paralympics
Judoka at the 2012 Summer Paralympics
Judoka at the 2016 Summer Paralympics
Medalists at the 2004 Summer Paralympics
Medalists at the 2016 Summer Paralympics
20th-century Japanese people
21st-century Japanese people